Chariots of the Gods may refer to 

 Chariots of the Gods?, a 1968 book by Erich von Däniken
 Chariots of the Gods (film), a 1970 documentary film, based on the book
 Chariot of the Gods (album), a 2022 studio album by Hoodoo Gurus